Sweet Home, Sweet Honey is a 2015 South Korean daily drama starring Song Ji-eun, Lee Jae-joon, Seo Yi-an and Kim Min-soo. It aired on KBS1 on Mondays to Fridays at 20:25 for 129 episodes from 2 November 2015 to 29 April 2016.

Plot
The story about a group of youngsters being pushed into society and the people around them.

Cast

Main characters
Song Ji-eun as Oh Bom / Choi Pa-ran (Choi Bom)
A girl who was claimed to be an illegitimate child of her father. She suffered abuse from her stepmother since young due to her illegitimate child status. In fact, Bom was adopted since young and had lost her memories of her childhood before adoption. Choi Pa-ran was her real name.
Lee Jae-joon as Kang Ma-roo
A man who fell in love with Bom.
Seo Yi-an as Choi Ah-ran
Oh Bom's love rival and an ambitious woman who often mistreated Bom out of jealousy. Things became more complicated when Ah-ran was revealed to be Bom's long-lost biological sister...
Kim Min-soo as Ahn Tae-ho
Choi Myung-gil as Bae Gook-hee 
Lee Young-ha as Choi Jung-gi
Kim Yu-seok as Ahn Gil-soo

Supporting characters
Kim Yong-rim as Kim Eul-nyeon
Choi Dae-chul as Lee Bae-dal 
Choi Su-rin as Kim Eul-nyun
Yoo Hye-ri as Lee Mi-dal
Joo Da-young as Choi Ji-ah
Yoo Yeon-mi as Oh Ga-eul 
Choi Jae-sung as Kang Tae-joon 
Yeo Hoon-min as Ahn Soo-ho

Awards and nominations

References

External links 
  
 
 

Korean Broadcasting System television dramas
2015 South Korean television series debuts
Korean-language television shows
2016 South Korean television series endings